The 1976 Alabama Crimson Tide football team (variously "Alabama", "UA" or "Bama") represented the University of Alabama in the 1976 NCAA Division I football season. It was the Crimson Tide's 82nd overall and 43rd season as a member of the Southeastern Conference (SEC). The team was led by head coach Bear Bryant, in his 19th year, and played their home games at Bryant–Denny Stadium in Tuscaloosa and Legion Field in Birmingham, Alabama. They finished season with nine wins and three losses (9–3 overall, 5–2 in the SEC) and with a victory over UCLA in the Liberty Bowl.

The Crimson Tide opened the season with an upset loss against Ole Miss. The loss ended a 20-game conference winning streak that dated back to their 1972 season. They rebounded from the loss with wins over both SMU and Vanderbilt, but then were shutout by Georgia in their fourth game. The shutout was the first for the Crimson Tide since their 1970 season, and with the loss Alabama also dropped out of the polls for the first time since 1970.

The Crimson Tide again bounced back from the loss and won their next five games. These wins included victories over Southern Miss, Tennessee, Louisville, Mississippi State and LSU. Alabama next lost their third game of the season in a much anticipated match-up at Notre Dame. They then closed the season with a victory over rival Auburn and UCLA in the Liberty Bowl.

Schedule

Stadium renaming
In September 1975, a bill sponsored by Alabama State Senator Bert Bank was passed by a margin of 88–0 to rename Denny Stadium to Bryant–Denny Stadium in honor of then head coach Bear Bryant. The stadium was then officially renamed as part of the halftime ceremonies during the 1976 A-Day game. At the time of its re-dedication, Bryant was quoted as saying "this is a tremendous honor and I am proud and humble."

Game summaries

Ole Miss

Sources:

As they entered the 1976 season, the Crimson Tide were in the No. 6 position in the AP Poll prior to their game against Ole Miss at Jackson. Against the Rebels, the Crimson Tide were upset by a final score of 10–7 that ended an overall eleven game winning streak and a 20-game conference winning streak that dated back to their 1972 season. Ole Miss scored their first points early in the game when George Stuart intercepted a Jeff Rutledge pass that was tipped by Gary Turner and returned it 24-yards for a 7–0 lead. The Rebels held their lead through the third quarter when Alabama tied the game 7–7 on a three-yard Calvin Culliver touchdown run.

Ole Miss then responded early in the fourth with what was a 34-yard, game-winning field goal from Carl Langley that made the final score 10–7. For leading his team to the upset, Ole Miss head coach Ken Cooper was recognized by United Press International as the UPI National Coach of the Week. The loss brought Alabama's all-time record against Ole Miss to 24–6–2.

SMU

Sources:

 
After their loss against Ole Miss, the Crimson Tide dropped into the No. 14 team prior to their game against Southern Methodist University (SMU). At Legion Field, Alabama ran for 419 yards and eight touchdowns in this 56–3 victory over the Mustangs in what was the first all-time meeting between the schools. The Crimson Tide had a slow start to the game offensively, and trailed 3–0 at the end of the first quarter behind a 40-yard John Dunlop field goal for SMU. However, they responded with four touchdowns in the second quarter en route to a 28–3 halftime lead after backup quarterback Jack O'Rear took over for Jeff Rutledge after the Crimson Tide offense had three turnovers on their first three possessions. O'Rear scored first on runs of seven and 19-yards, followed by Tony Nathan on a six-yard run and finally by Rutledge on a 45-yard pass to Ozzie Newsome.

Their scoring continued into the second half with a pair of touchdowns scored in each the third and fourth quarters. In the third, Johnny Davis scored on a 17-yard run and Nathan followed with his second touchdown of the game on a seven-yard run. In the fourth Lou Ikner scored first on an 11-yard run and Donald Faust made the final score 56–3 with his three-yard run late in the game. For the game, 65 players saw action on the field and Nathan led all runners with his 101 yards rushing.

Vanderbilt

Sources:

After their victory over SMU, Alabama moved into the No. 13 position in the AP Poll prior to their game against Vanderbilt. In their first Bryant–Denny game of the season, the Crimson Tide scored 21 first quarter points en route to a 42–14 victory over the Commodores at Tuscaloosa. Jack O'Rear scored first for Alabama with this 52-yard run. Johnny Davis followed with a pair of eight-yard touchdown runs that gave Alabama a 21–0 lead at the end of the first quarter. After Jeff Rutledge extended the Crimson Tide lead to 28–0 with his 27-yard touchdown pass to Ozzie Newsome, Vanderbilt made the halftime score 28–7 on a five-yard Jerry Hampton touchdown run.

In the third, the Crimson Tide scored first on a two-yard Calvin Culliver touchdown run. However, the Commodores responded with their longest offensive play of the game when Hampton connected with James Cox on a 43-yard touchdown pass and made the score 35–14. Alabama then made the final score 42–14 with a nine-yard Peter Cavan touchdown reception from Rutledge in the fourth quarter. The victory improved Alabama's all-time record against Vanderbilt to 33–17–4.

Georgia

Sources:

After their victory over Vanderbilt, Alabama moved into the No. 10 position and Georgia into the No. 6 position in the AP Poll prior to their game at Athens. Playing against the Bulldogs for the first time since their 1973 season, Georgia shut out the Crimson Tide, 21–0, and with the victory prevented Alabama from capturing its sixth consecutive SEC title. After a scoreless first quarter, Matt Robinson gave Georgia a 7–0 halftime lead with his three-yard touchdown run. The Bulldogs then closed the game with a two-yard Rayfield Williams touchdown run in the third and a six-yard Robinson touchdown pass to Ulysses Norris in the fourth for the 21–0 victory.

The shutout was the first suffered by the Crimson Tide since a 24–0 loss against Tennessee in 1970, and was also the first for Alabama since the installation of the wishbone offense starting with their 1971 season. The loss brought Alabama's all-time record against Georgia to 30–20–4.

Southern Miss

Sources:

After their loss to Georgia, Alabama dropped out of the AP Poll prior to their game against Southern Miss for the first time since their 1970 season. Before one of the smaller crowds to attend a Crimson Tide game at Legion Field in many decades, Alabama defeated the Golden Eagles 24–8. The Crimson Tide took a 14–0 first quarter lead behind touchdown runs of 26 and six-yards by Peter Cavan and John David Crow, Jr. They extended it further to 21–0 at halftime after Jeff Rutledge threw a four-yard touchdown pass to Ozzie Newsome in the second quarter.

After a scoreless third, Bucky Berrey connected on a 27-yard field goal early in the fourth. Southern Miss then responded with their only points on a four-yard Charles Clancy touchdown pass to John Pitts that made the final score 24–8. The victory improved Alabama's all-time record against Southern Miss to 16–2–1.

Tennessee

Sources:

After their victory over Southern Miss, Alabama reentered the AP Poll at the No. 20 position prior to their game against Tennessee. Before a nationally televised audience, the Crimson Tide defeated the heated rival Volunteers 20–13 at Neyland Stadium. Alabama took a 6–0 first quarter lead behind an 11-yard Tony Nathan touchdown run. Tennessee responded and tied the game 6–6 at halftime behind Jim Gaylor field goals of 24 and 40-yards in the second quarter.

In the third, both teams traded touchdowns on runs of 14 yards by Jack O'Rear for Alabama and 2 yards by Bobby Emmons for Tennessee that made the score as they entered the fourth tied 13–13. In the fourth, Calvin Culliver scored the game-winning points with this seven-yard touchdown run that made the final score 20–13. The victory improved Alabama's all-time record against Tennessee to 29–23–7.

Louisville

Sources:

After their win over Tennessee, Alabama moved into the No. 18 position of the AP Poll prior to their game against Louisville. On homecoming in Tuscaloosa, Alabama defeated the Cardinals 24–3 in what was the first all-time meeting between the schools. After a scoreless first, Alabama took a 14–0 lead behind touchdown runs of ten-yards by Tony Nathan and 12-yards by Johnny Davis. Louisville responded late in the quarter with their only points of the game on a 46-yard Pedro Posadas field goal that made the halftime score 14–3. The Crimson Tide then concluded their scoring in the third on a 14-yard Jack O'Rear touchdown run and a 27-yard Bucky Berrey field goal.

Mississippi State

Sources:

As they entered their game against Mississippi State, Alabama moved into the No. 17 position and the Bulldogs into the No. 18 position in the AP Poll. At Tuscaloosa, the Crimson Tide overcame a 14–0 deficit, came-from-behind and defeated Mississippi State 34–17. Behind quarterback Bruce Threadgill, the Bulldogs took a 14–0 first quarter lead over the Crimson Tide. Threadgill first threw a 16-yard touchdown pass to Duncan McKenzie and later scored himself on a 12-yard touchdown run.

Alabama scored their first points early in the second quarter on a 62-yard Jeff Rutledge touchdown pass to Ozzie Newsome. Both teams then traded field goals to close the half with Kinney Jordan connecting from 22-yards for the Bulldogs and Bucky Berrey connecting from 43 and 25-yards for the Crimson Tide to make the halftime score 17–12 in favor of Mississippi State.

Alabama took their first lead early in the third quarter on a 27-yard Johnny Davis touchdown run and extended it further to 27–17 later in the quarter on a 25-yard Pete Cavan touchdown run. Tony Nathan then concluded the scoring for the Crimson Tide with his four-yard touchdown run in the fourth that made the final score 34–17. The victory improved Alabama's all-time record against Mississippi State to 48–10–3.

LSU

Sources:

After their victory over Mississippi State, Alabama moved into the No. 15 position in the AP Poll prior to their game against LSU. Against the rival Tigers, Alabama won 28–17 behind a 130-yard, two touchdown performance by fullback Johnny Davis. After a scoreless first quarter, LSU took a 3–0 lead in the second on a 48-yard Mike Conway field goal. Alabama responded with a pair of touchdowns on runs of seven-yards by Pete Cavan and nine-yards by Jeff Rutledge en route to a 14–3 halftime lead.

The Crimson Tide then maintained their lead through the second half as the teams traded touchdowns. In the third, Johnny Davis scored for the Crimson Tide with his 13-yard run and Pat Lyons scored for the Tigers with this one-yard run. In the fourth Davis scored again for Alabama on a 58-yard run and Terry Robiskie scored on a six-yard run that made the final score 28–17 in favor of the Crimson Tide. The victory improved Alabama's all-time record against LSU to 26–10–4.

Notre Dame

Sources:

After their victory over LSU, Alabama moved into the No. 10 position and Notre Dame into the No. 18 position in the AP Poll prior to their game at South Bend. In what was their first regular-season game against the Fighting Irish, Alabama was upset 21–18 after Notre Dame scored three second quarter touchdowns. The first quarter was scoreless, although Notre Dame missed on two golden scoring opportunities—one on a missed field goal, the other when freshman running back Vagas Ferguson's fumble in the end zone was recovered by Alabama for a touchback.  The Irish took a 14–0 lead in the second quarter behind a 56-yard Rick Slager touchdown pass to Dan Kelleher and a two-yard Al Hunter touchdown run. Alabama responded with a one-yard Jack O'Rear touchdown run, but that was followed with a 17-yard Ferguson touchdown run that made the halftime score 21–7 in favor of Notre Dame.  The Irish gained a stunning 366 yards in the first half, to 166 for Alabama.

Although the Crimson Tide defense shutout the Irish in the second half, the offense was only able to score 11 points and lost 21–18. Alabama points were scored in the third on a 38-yard Bucky Berrey field goal and in the fourth on a 30-yard Jeff Rutledge touchdown pass to Ozzie Newsome. The loss brought Alabama's all-time record against Notre Dame to 0–3.

Auburn

Sources:

As they entered the annual Iron Bowl, Alabama dropped into the No. 18 position in the AP Poll prior to their match-up at Legion Field against Auburn. In what was the first game coached by Doug Barfield as the head coach of the Tigers, the Crimson Tide were victorious with this 38–7 win at Birmingham. After a scoreless first, Alabama took a 14–0 lead into halftime after second quarter touchdowns were scored on runs of one-yard by Rick Watson and 14-yard by Tony Nathan.

The Crimson Tide extended their lead to 35–0 with a trio of touchdowns in the third quarter. They were scored on a 42-yard Jeff Rutledge pass to Ozzie Newsome, a 14-yard Nathan run and on an 11-yard Rutledge run. A 47-yard Bucky Berrey field goal in the fourth extended the Alabama lead to 38–0. Auburn did manage to score late an prevent the shutout on a one-yard Foster Christy touchdown run late in the game. The victory improved Alabama's all-time record against Auburn to 23–17–1.

UCLA

Sources:

Playing before the then-largest crowd to ever attend the Liberty Bowl, Alabama stunned the once-beaten UCLA Bruins 36–6 at Memphis in the first all-time meeting between the schools. Alabama took a 17–0 first quarter lead on a 37-yard Bucky Berrey field goal, a 44-yard Barry Krauss interception return and a two-yard Johnny Davis touchdown run. They then extended their lead to 24–0 at halftime on a second quarter halfback option play of 20-yards from Tony Nathan to Jack O'Rear. After a pair of Berrey field goals extended the Crimson Tide lead to 30–0, UCLA scored their only points in a 61-yard Jim Brown run in the fourth. Rick Watson then scored the final points of the game for Alabama with his one-yard touchdown run that made the final score 36–6.

NFL Draft
Several players that were varsity lettermen from the 1976 squad were drafted into the National Football League (NFL) in the 1977, 1978 and 1979 drafts. These players included:

Roster

References
General

 
 

Specific

Alabama
Alabama Crimson Tide football seasons
Liberty Bowl champion seasons
Alabama Crimson Tide football